The 1939 New Mexico Lobos football team represented the University of New Mexico as a member of the Border Conference during the 1939 college football season. In their third season under head coach Ted Shipkey, the Lobos compiled an overall record of 8–2 record with a mark of 4–2 against conference opponents, placing second in the Border Conference, and outscored all opponents by a total of 167 to 98.

Schedule

References

New Mexico
New Mexico Lobos football seasons
New Mexico Lobos football